Free Air is a 1922 American silent comedy drama film directed by Edward H. Griffith and starring Tom Douglas, Marjorie Seaman and Henry G. Sell. It is an adaptation of the 1919 novel Free Air by Sinclair Lewis.

Cast
 Tom Douglas as Milt Daggett
 Marjorie Seaman	as Claire Boltwood
 George Pauncefort as Henry B. Boltwood
 Henry G. Sell as Jeffrey Saxton
 Dorothy Allen as Minne Rauskekle
 Ben Hendricks Jr. as The Tramp

References

Bibliography
 Munden, Kenneth White. The American Film Institute Catalog of Motion Pictures Produced in the United States, Part 1. University of California Press, 1997.

External links
 

1922 films
1922 comedy films
1920s English-language films
American silent feature films
American black-and-white films
Films directed by Edward H. Griffith
Films distributed by W. W. Hodkinson Corporation
Silent American comedy films
1920s American films